FERb 033 is a synthetic, nonsteroidal estrogen that was synthesized in 2009 and is used in scientific research. It is a potent and selective ERβ agonist (Ki = 7.1 nM, EC50 = 4.8 nM), with 62-fold selectivity for the ERβ over the ERα.

See also
 8β-VE2
 Diarylpropionitrile
 ERB-196
 Erteberel
 Prinaberel
 WAY-166818
 WAY-200070
 WAY-214156

References

Chloroarenes
Fluoroarenes
Aldoximes
Selective ERβ agonists
Synthetic estrogens
Phenols
Biphenyls